The members of the National Assembly of Zambia from 2011 until 2016 were elected on 20 September 2011. They consisted of 150 elected members, eight members appointed by the President and the Speaker.

List of members

Elected members

Replacements by by-election

Non-elected members
President Michael Sata originally nominated ten members instead of the eight allowed under the constitution, before dropping Wilie Nsanda and Samuel Mukupa the following day.

Replacements

References

2011